Break the Silence may refer to:

Break the Silence (Alana Grace album), and the title track
Break the Silence (van Canto album), the fourth album by van Canto
"Break the Silence" (Jason Hartman song), debut single by South African Jason Hartman
"Break the Silence" (Thomas Ring song), 2011
"Break the Silence", a song by Heavenly from their 2001 album Sign of the Winner
"Break the Silence", a song by Killswitch Engage from their 2006 album As Daylight Dies
"Break the Silence", a song by Thousand Foot Krutch from their 2003 album Phenomenon
"Break the Silence", a song by Seventh Wonder from their 2008 album Mercy Falls
Break The Silence, winner of Community Music Clip at the 2016 Australian National Indigenous Music Awards by the Ngukurr community

See also
Breaking the Silence (disambiguation)